The women's shot put at the 1950 European Athletics Championships was held in Brussels, Belgium, at Heysel Stadium on 23 August 1950.

Medalists

Results

Final
23 August

Participation
According to an unofficial count, 12 athletes from 8 countries participated in the event.

 (1)
 (1)
 (2)
 (1)
 (1)
 (3)
 (1)
 (2)

References

Shot put
Shot put at the European Athletics Championships
Euro